"Reckless" is a song by Christian Contemporary-Alternative-Rock musician Jeremy Camp from his seventh studio album, Reckless. It was released on November 16, 2012, as the first single from the album.

Composition 
"Reckless" was written by Jeremy Camp and Andrew "Andy" Dodd.

Release 
The song "Reckless" was digitally released as the lead single from Reckless on November 16, 2012.

Charts

References 

2012 singles
Jeremy Camp songs
Songs written by Andy Dodd
2012 songs
Songs written by Jeremy Camp